Love Connection is an American television dating game show in which singles attempt to connect with a compatible partner. Originally hosted by Chuck Woolery, the show debuted in syndication on September 19, 1983, and ended on July 1, 1994, after 2,120 shows. Reruns continued to air until September 8, 1995. The series was relaunched for one season in 1998 under the same title with Pat Bullard as host. In 2017, the series returned on Fox with Andy Cohen hosting. This second revival ran for two seasons.

Love Connection was produced by Eric Lieber Productions in association with and distributed by Telepictures (1983–1986), Lorimar-Telepictures (1986–1989), Lorimar Television (1989–1990), and Warner Bros. Television (1989–1994).

Format
Love Connections main premise was to arrange dates for couples. A guest appeared on the show after going on a date with one of three contestants, having chosen on the basis of the contestants' videotaped profiles. After the date, the televised appearance was scheduled.

Love Connection tapings took place before a live studio audience. Woolery introduced the guest and show excerpts from the three candidates' videos. The studio audience then secretly voted on which candidate they preferred for the guest. (In the 1998–99 version, home viewers voted online and were included in the tally.) The guest then revealed whom he or she had actually dated, and the date joined the conversation from backstage via closed-circuit television camera. Woolery led the guest and date to discuss their time together. If they both agreed that the date had been successful, the couple would be reunited onstage; otherwise, the date's participation in the show ended. Woolery then revealed the vote result; if the guest had had a successful date with the vote winner, Woolery congratulated the couple for making a "love connection", and they would usually (but not always) accept the offered prize of a second date at the show's expense.

After a successful date, the guest was always offered another date with that person. However, if the vote winner was one of the other contestants, the guest could choose a date with the vote winner, regardless of the success of the first date. In addition, if the guest had already unsuccessfully dated the audience pick, the guest could choose to go on a date with either of the other contestants. If a second date took place, the couple would be invited back for a second interview at a later taping. Two or three segments usually aired per show. In a variation that aired on Fridays, a bachelor or spinster who had not yet chosen a date made an appearance and allow the studio audience to make the choice for him or her, based on video excerpts. The couple would report back in the usual fashion several weeks later. If the couple hit it off, they were entitled to a second date at the show's expense. If not, the contestant could choose between the two losing candidates for the second date.

In the 2017 revival, the guest appeared on the show after having gone on a date with each of the three contestants, and all three were interviewed from backstage after the video intros and audience vote. This version added a segment where guests and contestants rate their first impressions of each other's looks on a scale of 1–10; however, some contestants have acknowledged basing this rating in part on factors other than physical looks, such as punctuality or fashion sense. After the interviews, the guest received an overnight date with the contestant of his or her choice, along with a chance to receive a $10,000 cash prize. In season 1, the guest automatically received the prize if the audience vote matched his or her choice; otherwise, the guest was given the option to instead spend the overnight date with the vote winner and thereby receive the monetary prize. In season 2, the option to switch was dropped; the guest spent the overnight date with the contestant he or she chose, and the $10,000 prize was awarded if the audience vote matched that choice.

The great majority of contestants in the original series were in their twenties and had never been married. However, older never-married, widowed, and divorced (some multiple times) contestants were occasionally selected as well. The relationship status of the contestants was noted on-screen in their profile summary in both syndicated iterations of the show, but is not referenced in the 2017 revival unless it arises in conversation between the guest, dates, and host. In the original series, men were paired only with women, and vice versa; the 2017 revival has included same-sex pairings. The show paid the expenses incurred on the date, plus $75 for incidentals. The incidental amount was increased to $100 for the 1998–1999 revival. In the 2017 revival, contestants were given $500 for each date.

Legacy
The show was one of the biggest game show hits of the 1980s and early 1990s, and helped revive Chuck Woolery's hosting career. At 11 seasons and 2,120 episodes, it was one of the longest lasting game shows in syndication. For many years it was third behind Merv Griffin's Jeopardy! and Wheel of Fortune (formerly hosted by Woolery) for longest lasting game show in syndication, but since has been surpassed by Family Feud and Who Wants to Be a Millionaire. Coincidentally, the show premiered on the same date (September 19) that Woolery's former show, Wheel of Fortune, debuted its syndicated edition in 1983.

There is a scene in the 1990 movie Misery where Annie Wilkes is watching the show while eating Cheetos.

As of 1993, among the couples who met on the show, there were a total of 29 marriages, 8 engagements, and 15 children, according to Woolery.

A year later, in a Daily Variety trade ad promoting the end of the original show's run after 11 seasons, it was stated that there were 35,478 taped interviews, 2,120 episodes, 31 marriages, and 20 children.

"Two and two"
Woolery created his catch phrase "we'll be back in two and two" on Love Connection, often accompanied by a two-fingered hand gesture. The line referred to the fact that the program would return in two minutes and two seconds, the total length of a standard commercial break at the time, including the fade-out and fade-ins bookending each break. Woolery would later use this phrase on other shows he hosted as well.

Syndication
The Chuck Woolery episodes were rerun on the USA Network from October 16, 1995 to June 6, 1997 and on the Game Show Network from January 6, 2003 to July 18, 2008. Beginning November 9, 2009, the Woolery episodes returned to GSN's weekday lineup but have since been removed. The Pat Bullard version has not been aired since its cancellation. GameTV will start airing the Chuck Woolery season on March 6, 2020. Only a few episodes have aired on there since.

Revivals
In 2015, a remake of the show was in development by Warner Bros. for a shot in 2016 with comedian Loni Love as host, but those plans fell through.

On January 11, 2017, Fox announced plans to revive the series for Summer 2017, with Andy Cohen serving as host. The reboot premiered at 9:00 p.m. ET on May 25, 2017. On August 10, 2017, Fox renewed the series for a second season, which premiered on May 29, 2018. The second season concluded on September 18, 2018. Cohen announced the series' cancellation on February 27, 2019.

Ratings

Season 1 (2017)

Season 2 (2018)

References

External links
 Official site (Fox)
 
 

1983 American television series debuts
1994 American television series endings
1998 American television series debuts
1999 American television series endings
1980s American game shows
1990s American game shows
2017 American television series debuts
2018 American television series endings
2010s American game shows
American dating and relationship reality television series
English-language television shows
First-run syndicated television programs in the United States
Television series by Warner Bros. Television Studios
Television series by Lorimar Television
American television series revived after cancellation
Fox Broadcasting Company original programming
Television series by Telepictures
Television series by Lorimar-Telepictures